Mohammad Yosuf Kargar is an Afghan football manager who coached the Afghanistan national football team from 20082009 and from 20102014.

Career
His family set up Afghanistan’s first ski resort, and he became the national champion in 1978 at the age of 16. He stopped skiing due to the 1979 Soviet invasion of Afghanistan. During the 1970s and 1980s, he was a member of the Afghanistan national football team. He coached Afghan youth teams after becoming the senior manager of the Afghanistan National Team in 2001. His biggest achievement is leading the Afghanistan National football team to SAFF Cup trophy in 2013.

Attack in January 2015
Kargar was stabbed near his residence in Kabul on January 10, 2015. He sustained a head injury and a knife wound in his back.

References

1962 births
Living people
Afghan footballers
Afghan football managers
Afghanistan national football team managers
Stabbing survivors
Association footballers not categorized by position